Shin Eun-joo (born 9 September 1993) is a South Korean handball player for Incheon City and the South Korean national team.

Career
In December 2019 Shin was called up to the South Korean national team and competed in the 2019 IHF World Handball Championship. During the competition she appeared in all eight games as the starting left wing and scored 25 goals, ranked third in Team Korea behind Ryu Eun-hee (69) and Lee Mi-gyeong (40).

References

1993 births
Living people
South Korean female handball players
Handball players at the 2018 Asian Games
Asian Games gold medalists for South Korea
Asian Games medalists in handball
Medalists at the 2018 Asian Games